The Senior men's race at the 1988 IAAF World Cross Country Championships was held in Auckland, New Zealand, at the Ellerslie Racecourse on March 26, 1988.   A report on the event was given in the Glasgow Herald.

Complete results, medallists, 
 and the results of British athletes were published.

Race results

Senior men's race (12 km)

Individual

Teams

Note: Athletes in parentheses did not score for the team result

Participation
An unofficial count yields the participation of 204 athletes from 35 countries in the Senior men's race, two athletes less than the official number published.

 (8)
 (2)
 (3)
 (9)
 (6)
 (6)
 (8)
 (2)
 (3)
 (7)
 (9)
 (8)
 (6)
 (9)
 (2)
 (7)
 (7)
 (1)
 (9)
 (8)
 (9)
 (1)
 (6)
 (9)
 (6)
 (9)
 (9)
 (4)
 (2)
 (9)
 (9)
 (1)
 (2)
 (6)
 (2)

See also
 1988 IAAF World Cross Country Championships – Junior men's race
 1988 IAAF World Cross Country Championships – Senior women's race

References

IAAF World Cross Country Championships
Senior men's race at the World Athletics Cross Country Championships